46th Street station is an elevated SEPTA rapid transit station in Philadelphia, Pennsylvania. It is located above the intersection of Farragut, 46th, and Market Streets in the Mill Creek and Walnut Hill neighborhoods of West Philadelphia, and serves the Market-Frankford Line.

The station is also served by SEPTA bus routes 31 and 64.

History

 The station was closed from June 2006 to April 2008 as part of a multi-phase reconstruction of the entire western Market Street Elevated. The renovated station, which included new elevators, escalators, lighting, and other infrastructure, as well as a new brick station house, reopened on April 14, 2008, The project resulted in the station becoming compliant with the Americans with Disabilities Act.

Station layout
The station has two side platforms. The station house is located at the southeast corner of Market and Farragut streets, but there are also two exit-only staircases descending to the west side of the intersection.

Immediately east of the station, the trains go underground into the Market Street subway. A stub from when the elevated section used to continue along Market Street was once present, but was removed when the structure was replaced during renovations.

References

External links
 

 Station house from Google Maps Street View
 Images at NYCSubway.org
 Images at The Subway Nut

SEPTA Market-Frankford Line stations
Railway stations in Philadelphia
Railway stations in the United States opened in 1907
1907 establishments in Pennsylvania